Wat Sommanat is a khwaeng (sub-district) in Pom Prap Sattru Phai District, Bangkok.

Description & topography
Wat Sommanat is named after Wat Sommanat Wihan, a local Buddhist temple that faces Khlong  Phadung Krung Kasem canal. The area is considered as the northernmost part of the district, with a total area of 0.350 km2 (0.135 mi2).

The sub-district bordered by other areas (from the north clockwise): Dusit and Suan Chitlada in Dusit District (Khlong  Phadung Krung Kasem is a borderline), Si Yaek Maha Nak in Dusit District (Khlong  Phadung Krung Kasem is a borderline), Khlong Maha Nak and Ban Bat in its district (Lan Luang Road is a borderline), and Ban Phan Thom with Bang khun Phrom in Phra Nakhon District (Outer Ratchadamnoen Avenue is a borderline).

It can also be divided into five communities.

Nang Loeng is another name for the area.

Population
In 2019, it had a total population of 6,672 people.

Places
Pom Prap Sattru Phai Office District
Wat Sommanat Wihan
Wat Sunthorn Thammathan (Wat Khae Nang Loeng)
Talat Nang Loeng
Thewakam Rangrak Bridge (shared with Si Yaek Maha Nak and Suan Chitlada of Dusit)
Rajadamnern Boxing Stadium
Ministry of Tourism and Sports
 Nanglerng Police Station
King Prajadhipok Museum

Cites

Pom Prap Sattru Phai district
Subdistricts of Bangkok